The Police Dependants' Trust is a body which looks after the interest and welfare of the families of British police officers who have died or been incapacitated as a result of injury while on duty.

It was set up in 1966 from financial donations which flooded in after three officers in London were shot dead in cold blood by three men whose car they had stopped for a routine inspection (Massacre of Braybrook Street). The initial contributor was holiday camp owner Billy Butlin, who anonymously donated £100,000. Public donations soon swelled the fund to one million pounds.

The three killers were all given life sentences. One of them died behind bars in 1981, while another was released on licence after 25 years, he died, murdered, eight years later.  Harry Roberts was released on licence in November 2014, after serving 48 years.

External links
 Now amalgamated into the charity Poolice Care Uk Police Care UK

Law enforcement in the United Kingdom